Narnoor is a mandal in the Adilabad district of the Indian state of Telangana.

Administration 
Narnoor Mandal consists of 24 Gramapanchayat. The village is in the agency area, which is headed under the Integrated Tribal Development Agency Utnoor. The mandal is divided into two more mandals, the second one being Gandiguda.

Demographics 
Ninety percent of Narnoor Mandal residents are members of scheduled tribes, notably the Gonds, Kolams, Mahar, Buddhist  and Lamabadies.

Geography 
The mandal is located in forest area. A notable natural feature near the village is Kundai Waterfall.

Culture 
The temple Sri Venkateswara Swamy Temple, also known as Mini Thirupathi, is located in Narnoor Mandal.

References 

Mandal headquarters in Adilabad district